Lawangan or Luangan people are a sub-ethnic of the Dayak Dusun people (East Barito) group, sometimes also referred to as Dusun Lawangan or Dayak Lawangan. The Lawangan people inhabit the eastern side of Central Kalimantan and West Kutai Regency, East Kalimantan, Indonesia. In Tabalong Regency, South Kalimantan, the Lawangan people can be found only in Binjai village. They speak Lawangan language.

The organization of this people is Dusmala which is made up of three sub-ethnic Dayak people namely, Dusun people, Ma'anyan people and Lawangan people.

Lawangan sub-ethnic
The sub-ethnic of the Lawangan people are:-
 Dayak Benuaq people
 Dayak Bentian people
 Dayak Bawo people
 Dayak Tunjung people
 Dayak Kutai people (practices Malay culture)
 Dayak Paser people
 Tawoyan people (77% similarity in language)
 Dusun Deyah people (53% similarity in language)

Culture

Food
 Bagamat, a giant bat meat gravy cooked with garlic and various vegetables.

Customary region
Tabalong Regency is made up of four Dayak cultural region, where one them includes the customary region of the Lawangan people, which are:-
 Binjai village, the customary region of the Lawangan people
 Warukin village, the customary region of the Ma'anyan people
 The ten villages that compose Upau district, Haruai district and Bintang Ara district, the customary region of the Denyah Kampung Sepuluh people
 Muara Uya district and Jaro district, the customary region of the Denyah people

Outside of these four Dayak customary regions in Tabalong Regency, there are also the Banjar people which forms the majority of the Tabalong population, although the Banjar people are not tied to the customary laws of the Dayak people.

References

External links
Lawangan people

Ethnic groups in Indonesia
Dayak people